Tryin' to Get a Buck is the debut album by American rapper B-Legit, released March 2, 1993 on Sick Wid It Records. The album was produced entirely by Studio Ton. It peaked at number 41 on the Billboard Top R&B/Hip-Hop Albums and at number 26 on the Billboard Top Heatseekers. The album features guest performances by labelmates: E-40, Little Bruce, Levitti and Mac Shawn.

Little Bruce was featured on the original version of the track "Fuck and Get Up", but the reissue by Jive Records omitted him from the song.

Track listing
"Way Too Vicious" (featuring E-40) - 4:51
"Can't Fuck Wit' Me" (featuring E-40) - 5:27
"The Savage" - 3:57
"Tryin' to Get a Buck" (featuring Kaveo) - 3:57
"Fuck and Get Up" (featuring Little Bruce) - 4:35
"Dank Game" - 2:01
"Dank Room" - 5:27 
"Can't Stop Me" (featuring E-40 & Levitti) - 4:25
"Brought Us Back Chablis" - 1:27
"Late Nighter" - 4:44
"B-Legit" - 4:41
"Just Living" (featuring Mac Shawn) - 4:24
"Daily Routine" - 3:53
"Smob Out" - 4:13

Chart history

References

External links
 Tryin' to Get a Buck at Discogs
 Tryin' to Get a Buck at MusicBrainz
 Tryin' to Get a Buck at Tower Records

B-Legit albums
1993 debut albums
Albums produced by Studio Ton
Jive Records albums
Self-released albums
Sick Wid It Records albums